Rembelszczyzna  is a village in the administrative district of Gmina Nieporęt, within Legionowo County, Masovian Voivodeship, in east-central Poland.

As of 29 October 2008, the parish had 235 hectares of land and 483 inhabitants.

History
 The village is described as part of the parish of Tarchomin of 1785. 
 In the 1830s relay stations for an optical telegraph line from Warsaw to Moscow via St Petersburg were built in the village - neighboring stations were located in Bialoleka and Zegrz.
 In 1827, Rembelszczyzna had 131 inhabitants and 11 houses. In 1880, the population had risen to 160.

References

Rembelszczyzna